Emmanuelle Claret (30 October 1968 – 11 May 2013) was a French biathlete. Her best performance came in 1996 when she became world champion in the Biathlon World Championships 1996 in Ruhpolding at 15 km. She also won a silver medal with the French relay at the same championships. She won the overall World Cup in 1996. She has won three individual victories in the world cup.
She died of leukemia on 11 May 2013, aged 44.

References

External links
 
 
 

1968 births
2013 deaths
Deaths from leukemia
People from Gap, Hautes-Alpes
French female biathletes
Olympic biathletes of France
Biathletes at the 1994 Winter Olympics
Biathletes at the 1998 Winter Olympics
Biathlon World Championships medalists
Deaths from cancer in France
Université Savoie-Mont Blanc alumni
Sportspeople from Hautes-Alpes
20th-century French women